Natália Borges Polesso is a Brazilian writer.

Life
She was born in Bento Goncalves in 1981. She obtained a PhD from the Pontifical Catholic University of Rio Grande do Sul (Porto Alegre). She has published three books to date. She also writes for the Caxias do Sul newspaper Pioneiro and pens the online comic strip A Escritora Incompreendida.

In 2017, she was named as one of the Bogota39, a list of the 39 most promising young writers in Latin America. The other 38 included Samanta Schweblin, the Brazilian Gabriela Jauregui, María José Caro from Peru, Liliana Colanzi from Bolivia and Lola Copacabana.

Selected works
 2013 - Recortes para álbum de fotografia sem gente - stories (Modelo de Nuvem), winner of the Açorianos de Literatura prize 
 2015 - Coração à corda - poetry (Patuá)
 2016 - Amora - stories (Não Editora), winner of the Açorianos de Literatura prize and the Prémio Jabuti

References

21st-century Brazilian short story writers
21st-century Brazilian poets
21st-century Brazilian women writers
Brazilian women poets
Brazilian women short story writers
Living people
Year of birth missing (living people)